Redline is an extended play from American rock band Seventh Day Slumber. VSR released the EP on October 9, 2015.

Critical reception

Indicating in a four star review at CCM Magazine, Andy Argyrakis responds, "Redline...tips the scales back towards an intentionally aggressive tone." Nick Sabin, signaling in a three star review by HM Magazine, says, "For an EP, it's a venture that proves this is some of the band's best work yet, and if it's a stage-setter for a future full-length, it upholds the band's worth in their arena." Awarding the EP four and a half stars for New Release Today, Jonathan J. Francesco states, "Redline is another of those highlights for the year that will outshine many of the full-length releases for me." Christopher Smith, giving the EP three and a half stars at Jesus Freak Hideout, writes, "With many bands losing the edge they once had, both musically and lyrically, it's exciting to see Seventh Day Slumber regaining their relevance with Redline." Rating the EP four stars from 365 Days of Inspiring Media, Joshua Andre says, "Redline serves as a welcome and enjoyable alternative, for listeners who want more musical variety and edgier rock tunes."

Track list

References 

2015 debut EPs
Seventh Day Slumber albums